OctaDist is computer software for crystallography and inorganic chemistry program. It is mainly used for computing distortion parameters of coordination complex such as spin crossover complex (SCO), magnetic metal complex and metal–organic framework (MOF).

The program is developed and maintained in an international collaboration between the members of the Computational Chemistry Research Unit at Thammasat University., the Functional Materials & Nanotechnology CoE at Walailak University and the Switchable Molecules and Materials group at University of Bordeaux

OctaDist is written entirely in Python binding to Tkinter graphical user interface toolkit. It is available for Windows, macOS, and Linux. It is free and open-source software distributed under a GNU General Public License (GPL) 3.0.

Standard abilities
The following are the main features of the latest version of OctaDist:
 Structural distortion analysis
 Determination of regular and irregular distorted octahedral molecular geometry
 Octahedral distortion parameters
 Tilting distortion parameter for perovskite complex
 Molecular graphics
 3D modelling of complex
 Display of the eight faces of octahedron
 Atomic orthogonal projection and projection plane
 Twisting triangular faces
 Molecular superposition (Overlay)
 Other utilities
 Scripting language
 Surface area of the faces of octahedron
 Jahn–Teller distortion parameters
 Root-mean-square deviation of atomic positions

Capabilities
 Simple and flexible processes of use
 Cross-platform for both 32-bit and 64-bit systems
 Graphical user interface (GUI)
 Command-line interface (CLI)
 User-friendly interactive scripting code
 User-adjustable program setting
 On top of huge and complicated complexes
 Support for several outputs of computational chemistry software, including Gaussian, Q-Chem, ORCA, and NWChem

See also
 List of quantum chemistry and solid-state physics software

References

External links
 OctaDist official website
 OctaDist at Github repository
 OctaDist PyPI package
 OctaDist at IUCr software archive

Computational chemistry software
Crystallography software
Free science software
2019 software